Lingnania is a genus of assassin bug (family Reduviidae), in the subfamily Harpactorinae, containing a single described species, Lingnania braconiformis.

References

Reduviidae
Cimicomorpha genera
Monotypic Hemiptera genera